Kenny Neyens (born 13 January 1995) is a Belgian darts player playing in Professional Darts Corporation (PDC) events.

Career
Neyens has won two titles on the PDC Development Tour, one in Mülheim in 2016 and one in Wigan in 2017. He also participated in the 2017 PDC World Youth Championship, where he reached the quarter-finals, before losing to eventual runner-up Josh Payne 6–0.

He then qualified for the 2018 PDC World Darts Championship by winning the Central European qualifier against fellow Belgian Davyd Venken 6–4. He played Jamie Lewis of Wales in the preliminary round, and despite taking the first set, he would eventually lose the next two, to be knocked out of the tournament.

World Championship results

PDC
 2018: Preliminary round (lost to Jamie Lewis 1–2)

References

External links

1995 births
Professional Darts Corporation associate players
Belgian darts players
Living people
Sportspeople from Antwerp
People from Borgerhout